Mindless Behavior was an American boy band who were best known for the singles "My Girl" and "Mrs. Right", produced by Walter Millsap. The band was put together in Los Angeles in 2008, by Keisha Gamble, Vincent Herbert and Walter Millsap. The band trained in dance and singing for two years before releasing a recording in Japan Music. The members were all in their early teens when the band was created.

Shortly after, lead singer Crippen separated himself from the group, leaving behind the original three members. The group would then introduce two other members, singer EJ and Mike.

Career
They performed "My Girl" on The Today Show in November 2010. Their debut album, #1 Girl, was released on September 20, 2011. It debuted on the US Billboard 200 album chart at number seven.

Mindless Behavior toured with the Backstreet Boys, Justin Bieber, Jason Derülo, and was the opening act for Janet Jackson's 2011 tour. Mindless Behavior also headlined the first BET Closer to My Dreams Tour alongside Diggy Simmons, Lil Twist, Tyga, Trevante, and Jawan Harris. In 2011, Mindless Behavior headlined the SCREAM Tour with Diggy Simmons featuring OMG Girlz, Jacob Latimore, and Hamiliton Park. They have been predicted as Future Stars by This Must Be Pop.

In July 2012, they embarked their own 25-city tour, (#1 Girl Tour) with opening acts Jacob Latimore, Lil Twist, and rising star Kayla Brianna.

In March 2013, the band released their second studio album, All Around the World on March 12, 2013 and their feature film documentary, Mindless Behavior: All Around the World. Mindless Behavior announced the All Around The World Tour starting in July 2013.

On June 17, 2016, they released the music video for their third single, #OverNightBag. They announced that they were going on a tour their third album "No Parents Allowed Tour" but was cancelled soon after for unexplained reasons and are getting ready to release an independent movie titled "Misguided Behavior”. In February 2017, rumors started spreading around that the group had disbanded after Princeton announced it after answering a fan question as he claimed that the group wasn't getting the rights to their music and the members decided that they wanted to do solo careers.

Band members

Past members
 Prodigy (Craig Crippen, Jr.) – lead singer (2008–2013; 2014–2015)
 Princeton  (Jacob Perez) – backing vocalist, spokesperson (2008–2017)
 Ray Ray (Rayan Lopez) – backing vocalist, sub-rapper, main rapper (2008–2015)
 Roc Royal (Chresanto August) – backing vocalist, main rapper (2008–2014)
 EJ  (Elijah Johnson) – lead singer (2014–2017)
 Mike (Michael Martin) – backing vocalist, sub-lead singer (2015–2017)

Timeline

Member adjustments
The group experienced a lot of adjustments since their formation in 2008 that included original members Prodigy, Princeton, Ray Ray and Roc Royal.

In November 2013, it was announced that lead singer Prodigy left the group to pursue a solo career, which he proved to be untrue. He left the group because of bullying and mistreatment received from the camp. This left Princeton, Ray Ray and Roc Royal as a trio.

In April 2014, the group announced that EJ would replace Prodigy as the group's new lead singer.

In December 2014, Roc Royal was fired from the group due to his ill-mannered behavior. This included beating up a drug addict over money, having a baby at an early age and accusations of him stealing a producer's car. This in turn prompted Prodigy to return to the group to replace Roc Royal, who served a two-year sentence in prison for battery and robbery.

In June 2015, Prodigy left the group again, and it turned out that Prodigy was only a placeholder in the group to keep it a quartet. He left when Mike (who was the actual replacement of Roc Royal) joined the group.

In September 2015, Ray Ray decided to leave the group to pursue a solo career. This left EJ, Mike and Princeton (who was the only original member of the group left) as a trio until the disbandment of the group in February 2017.

Discography

Studio albums

Singles

Awards and nominations

References

External links

 Official site

American boy bands
Musical groups established in 2008
Musical groups disestablished in 2017
Musical quartets
American musical trios
Musical groups from Los Angeles
American contemporary R&B musical groups
African-American musical groups